Renaud (Renaud Séchan; born 1952) is a French singer, songwriter and actor.

Renaud may also refer to:
 Renaud (Desmarets), a 1722 opera by the French composer Henri Desmarets
 Renaud (opera), a 1783 opera by Antonio Sacchini
 Renaud Island, an island in the Biscoe Islands of Antarctica
 Renaud, Quebec, part of Laval, Quebec
 Renaud River, a tributary of the Rivière du Gouffre in Quebec, Canada
 a male French given name, related to the English name Reynold or Ronald

People with the surname Renaud
 Brent Renaud (1971–2022), American journalist
 Élisabeth Renaud (1846-1932), French teacher, socialist activist, and feminist; co-founder, Groupe Feministe Socialiste
 Francis Renaud (actor) (born 1967), French actor
 Francis Renaud (sculptor) (1887–1973), French sculptor
 François Renaud (1923–1975), French judge, assassinated
 Jean Renaud de Segrais (1624–1701), French poet
 Line Renaud (born 1928), French female singer and actress
 Michelle Renaud (born 1988), Mexican actress
 Paul Renaud (born 1975), French comic book artist and illustrator

People with the given name Renaud
 Renaud Laplanche (born 1970), French American entrepreneur and business executive

See also
 Regnault (disambiguation)
 Renault (disambiguation)
 Reynard (disambiguation)

Surnames from given names